Tim Gibuma and the Storm is an Australian band fronted by Papua New Guinea-born singer-songwriter Timothy Mawi Gibuma. Their album The Gaba - Gaba Mawi was nominated for 2000 ARIA Award for Best World Music Album. It is an album of traditional music of the Torres Strait Islands.

Discography

Albums

Awards and nominations

ARIA Music Awards
The ARIA Music Awards is an annual awards ceremony that recognises excellence, innovation, and achievement across all genres of Australian music. They commenced in 1987.

! 
|-
| 2000
| The Gaba - Gaba Mawi
| ARIA Award for Best World Music Album
| 
| 
|-

References

Australian world music groups
Indigenous Australian musical groups